was a Japanese physics professor in the World War II Japanese Atomic Energy Research Program of the Imperial Japanese Navy. Arakatsu was a former student of Albert Einstein.

Career

In 1928, Arakatsu became a professor in Taihoku Imperial University (now called National Taiwan University). In 1934 Arakatsu built a particle accelerator at Taihoku Imperial University in Taipei, Taiwan, and performed the first atomic nucleus collision experiment in Asia there, right after the experiment performed in Cavendish Laboratory of University of Cambridge. He discovered that each nuclear fission of a U-235 atom yields, on average, 2.6 neutrons.

In 1936, he became a professor in Kyoto Imperial University (now called University of Kyoto). 

In 1943, during World War II, he ran the Japanese Naval research program into nuclear technology, known as the F-Go Project. Next to Yoshio Nishina, Arakatsu was the most notable nuclear physicist in Japan. His team included Hideki Yukawa, who would become in 1949 the first Japanese physicist to receive a Nobel Prize.

Early on in the war Commander Kitagawa, head of the Navy Research Institute's Chemical Section, had requested Arakatsu to carry out work on the separation of Uranium-235. The work went slowly, but shortly before the end of the war he had designed an ultracentrifuge (to spin at 60,000 rpm) which he was hopeful would achieve the required results. Only the design of the machinery was completed before the Japanese surrender.

After the Americans atom bombed Hiroshima, he was transferred to Navy Minister Mitsumasa Yonai to form an investigative commission. This commission inspected the affected area to determine the effects of the bomb.

After the war, his reports and artifacts were largely destroyed or confiscated by the occupying GHQ, which brought much protest from Arakatsu and the international community. Whatever documents that had survived the purge are now kept in the Yamato Museum in Kure.

Bibliography
The following are books or papers published by refereed scientific journals:
The continuous spectrum of Hydrogen associated with each of the lines in the Balmer series, 1932, 1 edition published in English and held by 8 libraries worldwide
The principle of the conservation of angular momentum or the principle of the conservation of the symmetry or antisymmetry of the total wave function (Bose or Fermi Statistics) in molecules, 1932, 1 edition in English and held by 7 libraries worldwide
On some peculiar phenomena of the electrodeless ring discharge through Hydrogen in a long tube, 1932, 1 edition published in 1932 in English and held by 7 libraries worldwide
Notes on the validity of the principle of the conservation of spin angular momentum in the process of the artificial disintegration of lithium atoms, 1934, 1 edition published in       English and held by 6 libraries worldwide
Experimental studies on the artificial transmutation of certain light elements bombarded by ions of hydrogen and heavy hydrogen" in English and held by 6 libraries worldwideOn the anomalous absorption of [gamma]-rays. (The possibility of the quantum jump of the rest-mass of an electron.) 1932, 1 edition in English and held by 5 libraries              worldwideThe electrodeless ring discharge through potassium vapour 1932, 1 edition published in      English and held by 5 libraries worldwideThe activation of air by the electrodeless ring discharge, 1932, 1 edition published in     English and held by 5 libraries worldwideOn the anomalous absorption of -rays, 1932, 1 edition published in English and held by 3    libraries worldwideHiroshima atomic bomb, August 1945 and super-hydrogen bomb test at Bikini Atoll in the mid-Pacific, March 1954'', 1995, 1 edition published in English and held by 2 libraries          worldwide

Honors
Medal with Purple Ribbon (1961)
Order of the Rising Sun, 3rd class (1965)
Order of the Rising Sun, 2nd class (1973; posthumous)

Order of precedence
Third rank (1973; posthumous)

See also

Japanese nuclear weapons program
Taihoku Imperial University
Kyoto Imperial University

Notes

References
Rainer Karlsch - Zbynek Zeman, uranium secrets, 2003 - 
Excerpt from Keiko Nagase-Reimer: Research on the use of nuclear energy in Japan, 1938–1945. Marburg: Marburg Friends of Japan Series c / o Japan Center, Philipps-University, 2002. 

1890 births
1973 deaths
Academic staff of Kyoto University
Kyoto University alumni
20th-century Japanese physicists
Recipients of the Order of the Rising Sun, 3rd class
Recipients of the Order of the Rising Sun, 2nd class
Japanese expatriates in Taiwan